Progress M-42 was a Russian unmanned Progress cargo spacecraft, which was launched in July 1999 to resupply the Mir space station.

Launch
Progress M-42 launched on 16 July 1999 from the Baikonur Cosmodrome in Kazakhstan. It used a Soyuz-U rocket.

Docking
Progress M-42 docked with the aft port of the Kvant-1 module of Mir on 18 July 1999 at 17:53:21 UTC, and was undocked on 2 February 2000 at 03:11:52 UTC.

Decay
It remained in orbit until 2 February 2000, when it was deorbited. The deorbit burn occurred at 06:10:40 UTC and the mission ended at 06:57:20 UTC.

See also

 1999 in spaceflight
 List of Progress missions
 List of uncrewed spaceflights to Mir

References

Progress (spacecraft) missions
1999 in Kazakhstan
Spacecraft launched in 1999
Spacecraft which reentered in 2000
Spacecraft launched by Soyuz-U rockets